Na Kwang-hyun (born 21 June 1982) is a South Korean football player who formerly played for Trat F.C.

References

External links

1982 births
Living people
South Korean footballers
Daejeon Korail FC players
Daejeon Hana Citizen FC players
Korea National League players
K League 1 players
Expatriate footballers in Thailand
Myongji University alumni
Association football midfielders